The Boise State–Idaho football rivalry is a college football rivalry between the Broncos of Boise State University and Vandals of the University of Idaho in Moscow. The game was played annually 1971–2010, and with the exception of the 2001–2004 games, the rivalry was a conference game (Big Sky 1971–1995, Big West 1996–2000, and WAC 2005–2010). Boise State moved from the WAC to the Mountain West Conference in 2011 and the rivalry went on hiatus, with no future games currently scheduled.

The teams have played for the Governor's Trophy since 2001, won by BSU every year. In 2009, the game was televised nationally for the first time on ESPNU from Bronco Stadium in Boise. The 40th game in the rivalry in 2010 was televised live in prime time on ESPN2 on Friday, November 12 from the Kibbie Dome in Moscow.

First games
The game was originally scheduled to be played in Moscow, but due to inclement weather in the spring, the Vandals' new stadium was a month behind schedule.

Idaho rented BSU's stadium and was the "home" team, but the "visiting" Broncos built a 28–7 lead at halftime and pulled off a convincing 42–14 upset before 16,123 for an instant rivalry. Tony Knap's Broncos went 10–2 in 1971 and won the Camellia Bowl, but their two losses were both in conference. Idaho went 8–3 for the best record to date in school history; Don Robbins' Vandals were Big Sky champions, won eight consecutive games (a school record), and had three players selected in the 1972 NFL Draft.
 
The second game was played at the end of the 1972 season, again in Boise before 14,516 on the Saturday after Thanksgiving. The Vandals took a 7–0 halftime lead but Boise State responded in the third quarter with three touchdowns. Idaho returned an interception 75 yards for a touchdown and the Vandal freshman back-up quarterback ran for a touchdown with three minutes remaining to pull within a point; another run on the two-point conversion gave Idaho the win and evened the series at a game each. It was the first Big Sky home loss for the Broncos, who dropped to 7–4. Idaho finished 1972 at 4–7.

Bronco Stadium was expanded after the 1974 season and had the highest seating capacity in the Big Sky Conference. The rivalry contests with Idaho in Boise from 1976 to 1994 were the conferences' highest-attended games for those seasons.

Streaks
The Boise State–Idaho rivalry has been dominated by streaks. Upstart underdog Boise State College of Division II easily won the initial game over Division I Idaho in the season opener in 1971. It was Boise State's first-ever game against a University Division opponent. BSU became a university in 1974 and the Big Sky Conference moved to the new Division I-AA in 1978. BSU was 8–2–1 in the first 11 meetings, including five in a row 1977–81. Idaho immediately followed with twelve straight wins 1982–1993, and won 15 of 17 before Boise State began its current 12-game winning streak in 1999, in which BSU has dominated the Vandals. The composite score for the most recent dozen games is 613–213, an average BSU victory margin of over 33 points per game, ranging from 14 to 58 points. Boise State has won 13 of 15 games over Idaho since both teams moved up to Division I-A (now FBS) in 1996.

Governor's Trophy

When the Big West dropped football following the 2000 season, Boise State and Idaho joined different conferences. The Broncos moved up to the WAC, while Idaho joined the distant Sun Belt as a "football only" member (and remained in the Big West for all other sports). In an effort to keep the intrastate rivalry strong, then Governor Dirk Kempthorne, a UI alumnus (1975) and former student body president, commissioned the Governor's Trophy, a traveling trophy awarded to the winning team. Since its inception in 2001 for the 31st game, the trophy has yet to travel, as Boise State has won all ten games. During the four seasons (2001–2004) as a non-conference game, it was played early in the season. Idaho joined the WAC in 2005 to return the rivalry to a late-season conference game. Idaho has never won the trophy; BSU has handily won all ten games played for it. Since the 2010 game, no games have been scheduled and none are scheduled for the immediate future.

A few months before the teams' most recent meeting in Moscow in 2010, BSU president Bob Kustra expressed his displeasure with the behavior of Idaho fans. He told the editorial board of the Idaho Statesman that he and his wife no longer attended the series games in Moscow because Idaho fans had "a culture that is nasty, inebriated and civilly doesn't give our fans the respect that any fan should expect when visiting an away team." Subsequently, a Moscow bar sold T-shirts reading "Nasty, inebriated" for Idaho fans.

Accomplishments

Game results

Coaching records

Since first game in 1971

Boise State

Idaho

 Only tie was in 1975; the Big Sky enacted overtime for conference games in 1980, and all Division I games went to overtime in 1996.

See also
 List of NCAA college football rivalry games

References

College football rivalries in the United States
Boise State Broncos football
Idaho Vandals football
1971 establishments in Idaho
Recurring sporting events established in 1971